Sociedad Deportiva Atlético Camocha is a Spanish football club based in the neighbourhood of La Camocha, in the Asturian parish of Vega, Gijón. Founded in 1970, it currently plays in Primera Regional.

History
Sociedad Deportiva La Camocha was founded in 1955, and in 1966 reached an agreement with Sporting de Gijón to become its reserve team. In 1968, SD La Camocha was absorbed by Sporting and its rights in Tercera División finally acquired by the main club of Gijón and changed the name of the club to Club Atlético Gijón. SD La Camocha would continue existing after changing the name to SD Felgueroso, other local club.

After the end of the 1969–70 season, Sporting Gijón dissolves Atlético Gijón for only having one reserve team (Club Deportivo Gijón, current Sporting de Gijón B). Finally, on 6 July 1970 is created the current SD Atlético Camocha after the merge of SD La Camocha and Atlético Gijón.

In 1984, the club promoted for the first time to Tercera División, where it played during five consecutive seasons before being relegated again to the Regional leagues.

Season to season

5 seasons in Tercera División

Notable players
 Juanele

References

External links
LaPreferente.com profile

Football clubs in Asturias
Association football clubs established in 1970
1970 establishments in Spain
Divisiones Regionales de Fútbol clubs